Samuel Campbell (July 11, 1773June 2, 1853) was an American politician from New York.

Life
Campbell attended the common schools. He removed to Columbus, New York and engaged in agricultural pursuits. He was Supervisor of the Town of Columbus in 1807, 1808, 1821 and 1840.

He was a member of the New York State Assembly in 1808-09, 1812 and 1820. He served on the staff of Maj. Gen. Nathaniel King as division quartermaster in the War of 1812. He was an associate judge of the Chenango County Court in 1814, Sheriff of Chenango County from 1815 to 1819. and a Justice of the Peace for twenty-five years.

Campbell was elected as a Democratic-Republican to the 17th United States Congress, holding office from December 3, 1821, to March 3, 1823. Afterwards he resumed his agricultural pursuits, and later became a Whig.

He was buried at the Lambs Corners Cemetery.

References

The New York Civil List compiled by Franklin Benjamin Hough (pages 71, 182, 185, 195, 263 and 397; Weed, Parsons and Co., 1858)

1773 births
1853 deaths
People from Chenango County, New York
People from Mansfield, Connecticut
Members of the New York State Assembly
Town supervisors in New York (state)
New York (state) state court judges
American military personnel of the War of 1812
New York (state) Whigs
19th-century American politicians
Democratic-Republican Party members of the United States House of Representatives from New York (state)
New York (state) sheriffs